The South Carolina Gamecocks women's basketball team represents the University of South Carolina and competes in the Southeastern Conference (SEC). Under current head coach Dawn Staley, the Gamecocks have been one of the top programs in the country, winning the NCAA Championship in 2017 and 2022. The program also enjoyed success under head coach Nancy Wilson during the 1980s in the Metro Conference, when it won five regular season conference championships and three conference tournament championships.

History

The Gamecocks first competed at an intercollegiate level in women's basketball in 1923, when they were called the Pullets (a young domestic hen, a play off "Gamecocks," which is a rooster).

The modern era of South Carolina women's basketball began when the Carolina Chicks took to the court in January 1974 under the guidance of Pam Backhaus. The inaugural team compiled a record of 15–7 and were the South Carolina AIAW champions. In 1977, with Pam Parsons as the head coach the women's basketball team, they changed their nickname to the Lady Gamecocks and made post-season trips every year during her four-year tenure.

During its eight seasons in the Metro Conference (now Conference USA after the 1995 reunification), the Lady Gamecocks won the regular season championship five times and the conference tournament three times.

When South Carolina joined the SEC, success was hard to come by during their first decade in one of the strongest conferences in women's basketball. They initially struggled to compete under head coaches Nancy Wilson and Susan Walvius. Walvius' teams in 2001–02 and 2002–03 broke through to finish 25–7 and 23–8, respectively, earning trips to the NCAA tournament and reaching the Elite Eight in 2002.

Walvius resigned after the 2007–08 season. On May 7, 2008, Dawn Staley was named the new head coach of the team now known as simply the "Gamecocks".

Under coach Staley, the Gamecocks improved or equaled their win total every season during her first seven years leading the program, culminating in a 34–3 record in 2014–15. That year they won the SEC regular season championship, the SEC Tournament championship and the NCAA East Region Championship. The season ended in the NCAA Final Four with a last second one-point loss to Notre Dame in the national semifinals.

The following year, the Gamecocks went undefeated in conference play, only to be stymied in the Sweet 16 by Syracuse. In 2016–17, the Gamecocks garnered their third straight sweep of the SEC regular season and tournament titles en route to their second Final Four. They defeated conference rival Mississippi State in the national championship game to win their first-ever national title.

In the 2018 SEC tournament, the Gamecocks defeated Mississippi State to win the SEC tournament, South Carolina is the only team to win the SEC tournament for four straight years. Their season came to an end when they were defeated by Connecticut in the Elite Eight.

In 2020, South Carolina finished 32–1 (16–0), led by the #1 ranked recruiting class and senior leadership of point guard Tyasha Harris. The Gamecocks defeated 14 ranked teams including their first-ever victory over UConn, and won both the SEC regular season and tournament titles. South Carolina won their final 26 games of the season and spent the final nine weeks as the AP #1 ranked team. Dawn Staley was named national coach of the year, and Aliyah Boston was named national freshman of the year, and SEC defensive player of the year. When the COVID-19 pandemic ended the season prematurely on March 12, South Carolina was ranked at the top of the AP and coaches' polls. Due to the unprecedented abrupt ending to the season following the SEC Championship win, Staley said they should be claimed Champions, but never took any real steps to claim one. To honor the seniors the program raised a banner highlighting finishing #1 in the polls on December 31, 2020, at the 2020–21 season opener. In 2021, the team reached the Final Four losing to Stanford by a point.

On April 3, 2022, the Gamecocks won their 2nd national title with a 64–49 win over UConn, finishing the season 35–2 and being ranked #1 in both major polls for the entire season. Aliyah Boston won Player of the Year, and Dawn Staley was named Naismith Award winner as the best coach in the nation for 2022.

Current roster

Head coaches

Year-by-year results

Conference tournament winners noted with # Source

Postseason results

NCAA Division I

National Championships

AIAW Division I
The Gamecocks made two appearances in the AIAW National Division I basketball tournament, with a combined record of 6–3.

Attendance

Over the years, the Gamecocks have played in three different venues. At first games were played at the Blatt P.E. Center. Later games moved to the Carolina Coliseum, which saw the first sell out for a women's basketball game on January 17, 2002. That day, 12,168 fans turned out to see the South Carolina Gamecocks take on the Tennessee Lady Vols.

On November 22, 2002, the Gamecocks opened the newly constructed Colonial Life Arena (then known as Carolina Center;  the arena's deal with Unum was signed a year later) would be with $1 admission night, leading to a crowd 17,712 saw the Gamecocks defeat the archrival Clemson Lady Tigers.  The first sell out with 18,000 in attendance occurred on February 8, 2016, against the University of Connecticut Huskies in a match up of the two top ranked teams in the country.

Crowds of over 16,000 at Colonial Life Arena for Women's Basketball games:

South Carolina has led the nation in attendance every season since 2014–15, with the exception of 2020 which was limited due to COVID. The Gamecocks have averaged over 10,000 fans in 92 consecutive regular season home games.

* The 2019 NCAA Tournament games were played in Halton Arena, Charlotte, NC

Notes

 Between losses to Texas A&M on February 10, 2013, and Connecticut on February 8, 2016, the Gamecocks won 45 consecutive games at home.
 As of June 20, 2021, the Gamecocks have drawn over 10,000 fans in 92 consecutive regular season home games

Notable players

Gamecocks in the WNBA

Also drafted:
Teresa Geter – 2002 – 36th by Washington
Petra Ujhelyi – 2003 – 16th by Phoenix
Aleighsa Welch – 2015 – 22nd by Chicago

Retired jerseys
South Carolina has retired two jersey numbers.

Player and coach awards

National player awards

All-Americans
Katrina Anderson − 1979
Sheila Foster − 1981, 1982
Brantley Southers − 1984, 1985
Mindy Ballou − 1984, 1985, 1986
Martha Parker − 1987, 1988, 1989
Marsha Williams − 1992, 1993
Shannon Johnson − 1996
Jocelyn Penn − 1996
Tiffany Mitchell – 2015
A'ja Wilson – 2016, 2017, 2018
Tyasha Harris – 2020
Aliyah Boston – 2020, 2021, 2022, 2023
Destanni Henderson − 2022
Zia Cooke − 2023

Wade Trophy
A'ja Wilson – 2018
Aliyah Boston – 2022
 Honda-Broderick Cup
Aliyah Boston – 2022
Honda Sports Award
A'ja Wilson – 2018
Aliyah Boston – 2022
Naismith College Player of the Year
A'ja Wilson – 2018
Aliyah Boston – 2022
 Naismith Defensive Player of the Year
Aliyah Boston – 2022
 John R. Wooden Award
A'ja Wilson – 2018
Aliyah Boston – 2022
USBWA Women's National Player of the Year
A'ja Wilson – 2018
Aliyah Boston – 2022
AP College Player of the Year
A'ja Wilson – 2018
Aliyah Boston – 2022

Academic All-American of the Year
Aliyah Boston – 2021, 2022
Lisa Leslie Award
A'ja Wilson    − 2018
Aliyah Boston – 2020
Aliyah Boston – 2021
Aliyah Boston – 2022	
USBWA National Freshman of the Year
Aliyah Boston – 2020
Dawn Staley Award
Tiffany Mitchell – 2015
Tyasha Harris – 2020
Tamika Catchings Award (USBWA)
Aliyah Boston – 2020
USBWA National Freshman of the Year
Aliyah Boston – 2020

National coach awards
Naismith College Coach of the Year
Dawn Staley – 2020, 2022
WBCA National Coach of the Year
Dawn Staley – 2020, 2022
AP Coach of the Year
Dawn Staley – 2020
USBWA Women's National Coach of the Year
Dawn Staley – 2020, 2022

Conference awards

SEC Coach of the Year
Susan Walvius – 2002
Dawn Staley – 2014, 2015*, 2016, 2020, 2022, 2023
SEC Player of the Year
Tiffany Mitchell – 2014, 2015
A'ja Wilson – 2016, 2017, 2018
Aliyah Boston – 2022, 2023
SEC Tournament MVP
Aleighsa Welch – 2015
Tiffany Mitchell – 2016
A'ja Wilson – 2017, 2018
Mikiah Herbert Harrigan – 2020
Aliyah Boston – 2021, 2023

SEC Defensive Player of the Year
Ieasia Walker – 2013
A'ja Wilson – 2016, 2018
Aliyah Boston – 2020, 2021*, 2022, 2023
SEC Freshman of the Year

Alaina Coates – 2014
A'ja Wilson – 2015
Aliyah Boston – 2020
SEC 6th Player of the Year
Alaina Coates – 2014*
Kamilla Cardoso – 2023
SEC WBB Scholar Athlete of the Year
Aleighsa Welch – 2015

Metro Coach of the Year
Nancy Wilson – 1985, 1991
Metro Player of the Year
Brantley Southers – 1986
Martha Parker – 1988, 1989
Beth Hunt – 1990
Metro Newcomer of the Year
Martha Parker – 1986
Schonna Banner – 1987
Metro Tournament MVP
Brantley Southers – 1986
Martha Parker – 1988
Beth Hunt – 1989

* Denotes Co-Player / Co-Coach

References

External links